The Caterham Seven CSR is the latest model from sports car manufacturer Caterham Cars. The CSR is the most heavily modified Caterham, though it still retains the basic look of the Super Seven. The CSR has two engine options based on the same Duratec block, though modifications and power output differ. The entry level engine produces , with a  time of 3.7 seconds.

Performance 
The CSR represents the most radical redesign of the car since the introduction of the Seven in its 48-year history. The CSR is the subject of numerous improvements over previous models (see below), though it still retains the main aesthetics of Caterhams.

Handling and braking 
While slightly heavier than other Caterhams the CSR still upholds Colin Chapman's philosophy of "add lightness." Weighing only , the CSR has excellent handling, making it extremely agile. On the skidpad, the Caterham outperforms many supercars. Its 1.05 lateral g-force beats the 2007 Porsche 997 Turbo's 0.94 G, the Ferrari F50's 1.03 G, and the Ferrari Enzo's 1.01 G.

In braking tests, the CSR performs well. From  to a complete stop, the CSR took . The 997 Turbo, stopping from 60 mph took .

Low-end acceleration 
This discrepancy is due to the close gear ratios of the transmission and the rev limiter. The CSR that they tested could not reach  in first gear, and required the extra 0.5 seconds to shift. Car and Driver explains:

High-speed lift
The CSR, as with all Caterhams, has worse performance at higher speeds with respect to both acceleration and handling because of the poor aerodynamics. Caterhams suffer not only from a high , but also from lift.
These factors hinder both high-end acceleration, top speed, and handling. With such strong wind resistance, it requires much more power to overcome that force and increase top speed. Lift reduces contact force on the tires, causing the car to feel "loose" and not handle as well.

Cosworth engine 
The  Cosworth-tuned engine is heavily modified from the stock 2.3 litre Duratec. The cylinder head, block, crankshaft, connecting rods and pistons are upgraded by Cosworth. Cosworth also integrates an advanced dry-sump with an extra internal scavenge pump to distribute the oil. While a dry-sump system requires more oil (more weight), a dry-sump will keep the engine lubricated under hard cornering unlike a wet-sump system. Cosworth also radicalizes the cam shafts and upgrades the exhaust system. This may cause the engine to run a little more "rough" at low RPMs, but it drastically increases performance. The inlet system is also replaced with an advanced, custom roller-barrel system. This increases airflow at full throttle compared to a butterfly inlet, boosting performance. The engine also has a custom chip designed by Cosworth for a further increase in performance.

The  model uses the same Duratec block, but is not as heavily modified. The connecting rods and pistons are not upgraded significantly, though it does have the dry-sump system. The cam shafts are slightly radicalized, and the exhaust system is upgraded. The inlet system is enlarged, but not replaced with the roller-barrel system. The computer chip is upgraded, but not to the extent of the 260 model. Generally speaking, the 200 model is upgraded, albeit not as heavily.

Other features 
The CSR, has a variety of other features which enhance its performance. There are no power brakes or power steering, making the CSR extremely responsive and extremely agile. The clutch also engages extremely high, allowing for quick shifts while racing. In addition, the flywheel is very light. This makes heel-and-toe shifting extremely quick and easy as the engine revs up very quickly with little momentum.

Improvements 

The overall strength of the chassis is improved with the addition of new tubular steel to the frame. The weight of the car increases, but the torsional stiffness is improved by somewhere between 25% and 100%. The added reinforcement was necessary in order for the CSR to support the heavy 2.3 litre Duratec engine. The CSR is also wider than previous models, which increases handling ability.

Both rear and front suspension were completely redesigned for the CSR. The front suspension has double wishbone, fully adjustable, inboard springs and dampers, improving aerodynamics. The rear suspension is also upgraded to a double wishbone, fully independent system, replacing the De Dion tube design.

Caterhams have very poor aerodynamics due to the blunt windscreen, open-wheel design, and open cockpit. At very high speeds, lift becomes a problem. To combat this, the CSR has several features that reduce lift by 50%. The front cycle wings are fitted closer to the tires to reduce turbulence. In addition, they have a small lip that angles air upward and creates a small amount of down force. Also, the new front suspension scheme reduces turbulence and drag formerly caused by the spring and damper units. The biggest enhancement is the vent added on top of the nose cone. On previous Caterhams, the air from the radiator caused turbulence by knocking against the engine and other parts on the underside. A plastic panel behind the radiator now directs air straight out through the vent, creating down force and reducing turbulence.

Review 
Overall, the reviews of the CSR have been positive. Most magazines have only reviewed the 260 model. The main criticisms relate to the ease of driving and cost.
Automobile Magazine's Preston Lerner was impressed by the performance of the CSR:

The Caterham is the purest and most honest street car I've ever driven. Period. No power steering. No power brakes. No drive-by-wire. Just a direct connection between you and the contact patch. The responses to steering, throttle, brake, and gearshift inputs are so nearly instantaneous that they verge on the telepathic. And I can see exactly what's happening, at least at the front end of the car, as the wheels turn and judder.

 But complains about its uncomfortable ride:
"The CSR is not built for long-distance highway travel. Although the ride quality falls short of punishing, I had strongly discourage using the car for emergency surgery. The otherwise comfy seats move fore and aft, but the rake is fixed, which can be-and was for me-a real pain. Speaking of driver discomforts, there's no dead pedal for your left foot, and your right thigh gets a good grilling from the aluminum transmission tunnel. The snap-shut side curtains cannot be raised or lowered like conventional windows, so you're either freezing or sweltering."
Autocar complains about the price, but enjoys the CSR overall:
"Which brings us on to the CSR 260’s biggest problem: the price. A basic CSR 260 costs £37,000 if Caterham builds it, £34,500 if you do it yourself. Then there’s paint at £795, or £1100 for metallic. And those carbon seats? Lovely, but they cost £1200. Aerofoil front suspension arms are very cool, but should be for £500. And that limited-slip differential is £750. Caterham is asking a lot of money for this car.The CSR 260 is an intoxicating, extreme car, with racecar-like performance, fabulous grip levels and exceptional steering and handling. Few road cars will keep up with it in a straight line, fewer still down a twisting road or on a race track, and it has an excellent engine. But it isn’t perfect — the car’s packaging is showing its age and Caterham is demanding a serious amount of cash for a car that is so compromised — and so spartan." Edmunds.com enjoyed the CSR overall:"The CSR has got to be the performance bargain of the car world, despite any flaws when it comes to civility. As previously mentioned, the roof and flimsy side doors are useless. Luggage space is nearly nonexistent, and you better be OK with the fact that anything short of a Razor scooter will tower over you on the road. But what is all this harping about creature comforts? This is a Caterham Seven after all, the fastest to ever leave the factory and maybe the quickest accelerating car on the planet. That counts more than cupholders any day." Purchasing and licensing 

 In the UK 
The CSR is a legal production vehicle under the Individual Vehicle Approval scheme pending a vehicle inspection. The CSR may be purchased from Caterham directly as they are manufactured in the UK.

 In the United States 
The CSR was released in the United States in the summer of 2006 in very limited quantities. As a production vehicle, the CSR is illegal because of lack of safety features and failure to meet emissions standards. US law states that the engine and transmission must be purchased separately from the chassis. Chassis may be purchased from Superformance, Caterham's official distributor in the United States, and their network of dealerships nationwide.

While many previous models of Caterhams are sold as kit cars to customers in the US, the complexity of the CSR makes this much more difficult, and is discouraged by dealers. It is currently not a part of the US lineup available through Superformance.  As such, the CSR is not a kit car. It is a production vehicle built in England. Licensing depends on individual state, county, and city regulations.

 Facts and figures 

 Engine specifications 

2.3-litre Ford Duratec tuned by Cosworth inline four
 Displacement: 2.3 L 
 Bore and Stroke:  X  (undersquare)
 Valves: 16 valves, dual overhead camshafts
 Compression Ratio: 12:1
 Cooling: Water Cooled
 Oil Distribution: dry-sump with scavenge pump
 260 Model
 Maximum Power:   at 7500 rpm
 Maximum Torque:  at 6200 rpm
 Throttle Body: Upgraded Roller-Barrel system
 200 Model
 Maximum Power:   at 7000 rpm
 Maximum Torque:  at 5750 rpm
 Throttle Body: Widened butterfly system

 Transmission specifications 

 Performance specifications 
 Lateral Acceleration: 1.05 g on skidpad
 70-0 mph (Brake Test): 
 0-60 mph
260 Model: 3.1 seconds (estimated) reported by manufacturer, reported as 3.6 seconds by Car and Driver See above for explanation of discrepancy.''
 200 Model: 3.7 seconds (estimated)
 0-100 mph: 8.9 seconds (260 model)
 0-120 mph:15 seconds (260 model)
 Top Speed:  (260 model),  (200 model)

Vehicle specifications 
 Size and dimensions
 Kerb weight: 575 kg (1268 lb)
 Wheelbase: 
 Length: 
 Width: 
 Height:  (hood down),  (hood up)
 Ground Clearance: 
 Fuel Economy: 10.22 litres/100 km (23 mpg)
 Turning Radius: 11 m
 Steering: Rack and pinion, 2.2 turns lock to lock
 Brakes: 254 mm (10") discs, front vented, 4 piston front calipers
 Front Track: 
 Rear Track: 
 Seating Capacity: 2
 Tires: Avon CR500's, 195/45 R15 front, 245/40 R15 rear
 Lift:  at 
 Weight Distribution (Front-Rear): 49–51%

See also 
 Caterham Cars
 Lotus Seven

References

External links 

 Official Caterham Website

CSR 07
Rear-wheel-drive vehicles
Sports racing cars
Lotus Seven replicas